CARE (Cooperative for Assistance and Relief Everywhere, formerly Cooperative for American Remittances to Europe) is a major international humanitarian agency delivering emergency relief and long-term international development projects. Founded in 1945, CARE is nonsectarian, impartial, and non-governmental. It is one of the largest and oldest humanitarian aid organizations focused on fighting global poverty. In 2019, CARE reported working in 104 countries, supporting 1,349 poverty-fighting projects and humanitarian aid projects, and reaching over 92.3 million people directly and 433.3 million people indirectly.

CARE's programmes in the developing world address a broad range of topics including emergency response, food security, water and sanitation, economic development, climate change, agriculture, education, and health. CARE also advocates at the local, national, and international levels for policy change and the rights of poor people. Within each of these areas, CARE focuses on empowering and meeting the needs of women and girls and promoting gender equality.

CARE International is a confederation of fourteen CARE National Members, each of which is registered as an autonomous non-profit non-governmental organization in its own country, and four affiliate members.

History

1945–1949: Origins and the CARE Package 

CARE, then the Cooperative for American Remittances to Europe, was formally founded on November 27, 1945, and was originally intended to be a temporary organization. World War II had ended in August of the same year. After pressure from the public and Congress, President Harry S. Truman agreed to let private organizations provide relief for those starving due to the war. CARE was initially a consortium of twenty-two U.S. charities (a mixture of civic, religious, cooperative, farm, and labour organizations) with the purpose of delivering food aid to Europe in the aftermath of World War II. Donald M. Nelson was the first executive director, but then William N. Haskell served as executive director from late 1945 until 1947. The organization delivered its first food packages in 1946.

CARE's food aid took the form of CARE Packages, which were at first delivered to specific individuals: the US people paid $10 to send a CARE Package of food to a loved one in Europe, often a family member. President Truman bought the first CARE package. CARE guaranteed delivery within four months to anyone in Europe, even if they had left their last known address, and returned a signed delivery receipt to the sender. Because European postal services were unreliable at the time these signed receipts were sometimes the first confirmation that the recipient had survived the war.

The first CARE Packages were in fact surplus "Ten-in-One" US army rations packs (designed to contain a day's meals for ten people). In early 1946 CARE purchased 2.8 million of these warehoused rations packs, originally intended for the invasion of Japan, and began advertising in America. On May 11, 1946, six months after the agency's incorporation, the first CARE Packages were delivered in Le Havre, France. These packages contained staples such as canned meats, powdered milk, dried fruits, and fats along with a few comfort items such as chocolate, coffee, and cigarettes. (Several on the CARE Board of Directors wished to remove the cigarettes, but it was deemed impractical to open and reseal 2.8 million boxes.) 1946 also marked CARE's first expansion out of the US with the establishment of an office in Canada.

By early 1947 the supply of "Ten-in-One" ration packs had been exhausted and CARE began assembling its own packages. These new packages were designed with the help of a nutritionist. They did not include cigarettes and were tailored somewhat by destination: Kosher packages were developed, and for example packages destined for the United Kingdom included tea rather than coffee, and packages for Italy included pasta. By 1949 CARE offered and shipped more than twelve different packages.

Although the organization had originally intended to deliver packages only to specified individuals, within a year CARE began delivering packages addressed for example "to a teacher" or simply "to a hungry person in Europe". These unspecified donations continued and in early 1948 CARE's Board voted narrowly to officially move towards unspecified donations and to expand into more general relief. Some founding member agencies disagreed with this shift, arguing that more general relief would be a duplication of the work of other agencies, but donors reacted favourably, contributions increased, and this decision would mark the beginning of CARE's shift towards a broader mandate.

Between the first deliveries of 1946 and the last European deliveries of 1956, millions of CARE Packages were distributed throughout Europe, over 50% of them to Germany including many delivered as part of the Berlin airlift in response to the 1948 Soviet blockade of Berlin.

The US Agricultural Act of 1949 made surplus US agricultural products available to be shipped abroad as aid either directly by the US government or by NGOs including CARE. In 1954 Public Law 480, also known as the Food for Peace Act, further expanded the availability of surplus US food as aid. This act allowed CARE to expand its feeding programs and disaster relief operations considerably, and between 1949 and 2009 CARE used hundreds of millions of dollars' worth of surplus commodities in disaster relief and programs such as school lunch provision.

1949–1956: Transition out of Europe 

Although the organization's mission had originally been focused on Europe, in July 1948 CARE opened its first non-European mission, in Japan. Deliveries to China and Korea followed, which CARE described as aid to areas "implicated by WWII". In 1949 CARE entered the developing world for the first time, launching programs in the Philippines. Projects in India, Pakistan, and Mexico began soon after. 1949 also marked CARE's first expansion into non-food aid with the development of "self-help" packages containing tools for farming, carpentry, and other trades. In 1953, because of its expansion to projects outside Europe, CARE changed the meaning of its acronym to "Cooperative for American Remittances to Everywhere".

As Europe recovered economically, CARE faced the need to re-evaluate its mission: in 1955 several Board members argued that with the European recovery CARE's mandate was finished and the organization should dissolve. Other Board members however felt that CARE's mission should continue albeit with a new focus on the developing world. In July 1955 the Board of Directors voted to continue and expand CARE projects outside of Europe. Paul French, CARE's executive director at the time, resigned over the debate. New executive director Richard W. Reuter took over in 1955 and helped lead the organization in a new direction. Twenty-two of CARE's forty-two missions were closed, mostly in European countries, and efforts were concentrated on food distribution and emergency response in the developing world. In 1956 CARE distributed food to refugees of the Hungarian Revolution of 1956, and this would be among the last of CARE's operations in Europe for many years.

1957–1975: Transition into broader development work 

With a broadened geographic focus came a broadened approach as CARE began to expand beyond its original food distribution program. In order to reflect these new broader aims, in 1959 CARE changed the meaning of its acronym a second time, becoming the "Cooperative for American Relief Everywhere".
Reflecting this broadened scope, CARE became involved in 1961 with President John F. Kennedy's establishment of the Peace Corps. CARE was tasked with selecting and training the first group of volunteers, who would later be deployed to development projects in Colombia. The Peace Corps assumed greater control over the training of Peace Corps Volunteers in subsequent missions, but CARE continued to provide country directors to the Peace Corps until CARE-Peace Corps joint projects ended in 1967.

In 1962 CARE merged with and absorbed the medical aid organization MEDICO, which it had been working closely with for several years previously. The merger considerably increased CARE's capacity to deliver health programming including trained medical personnel and medical supplies.

During this transition the original CARE Package was phased out. The last food package was delivered in 1967 and the last tools package in 1968. Over 100 million CARE Packages had been delivered worldwide since the first shipment to France. Although 1968 marked the official "retirement" of the CARE Package the format would occasionally be used again, for example in CARE's relief to the republics of the former Soviet Union and to survivors of the Bosnian War. The concept was also revived in 2011 as an online campaign encouraging donors to fill a "virtual CARE Package" with food aid and services such as education and healthcare.

1967 also marked CARE's first partnership agreement with a government: for the construction of schools in Honduras. Partnership agreements with governments led programmes to become country-wide rather than targeted only to a few communities. CARE's programmes during this era focused largely on the construction of schools and nutrition centres, and the continued distribution of food. Nutrition centres in particular would become one of CARE's major areas of concentration, linking with school feeding programs and nutrition education aimed at new mothers.

In 1975 CARE implemented a multi-year planning system, again allowing programmes to become both broader and deeper in scope. Projects became increasingly multi-faceted, providing for example not only health education but also access to clean water and an agricultural program to improve nutrition. The multi-year planning system also increased the scope for country-wide projects and partnerships with local governments. A 1977 project for example provided for the construction of over 200 pre-schools and kindergartens throughout Chile over several years, jointly funded by CARE and the Chilean Ministry of Education.

1975–1990: From CARE to CARE International 

Although CARE had opened an office in Canada in 1946, it was not until the mid-1970s that the organization truly started to become an international body. CARE Canada (initially Care of Canada) became an autonomous body in 1973. In 1976 CARE Europe was established in Bonn following the successful fund-raising campaign "Dank an CARE" (Thanks to CARE). In 1981 CARE Germany was created and CARE Europe moved its headquarters to Paris. CARE Norway had been created in 1980, and CAREs in Italy and the UK were established. The popularity of CARE offices in Europe was attributed to the fact that many Europeans remembered receiving CARE assistance themselves between 1945 and 1955.

In 1979 planning began for the establishment of an umbrella organization to coordinate and prevent duplication among the various national CARE organizations. This new body was named CARE International and met for the first time on January 29, 1982, with CARE Canada, CARE Germany, CARE Norway, and CARE USA (formerly simply CARE) in attendance.

CARE International would expand significantly during the 1980s, with the addition of CARE France in 1983; CARE International UK in 1985; CARE Austria in 1986; and CARE Australia, CARE Denmark, and CARE Japan in 1987.

1990–present: Recent history 

Along with broader development work CARE's projects in the 1980s and early 1990s focused particularly on agroforestry initiatives such as reforestation and soil conservation in eastern Africa and South America. CARE also responded to a number of major emergencies during this period, notably the 1983–1985 famine in Ethiopia and the 1991–1992 famine in Somalia.

The 1990s also saw an evolution in CARE's approach to poverty. Originally CARE had viewed poverty primarily as a lack of basic goods and services such as food, clean water, and health care. As CARE's scope expanded both geographically and topically this approach was expanded to include the view that poverty was in many cases caused by social exclusion, marginalization, and discrimination. In the early 1990s CARE adopted a household livelihood security framework which included a multidimensional view of poverty as encompassing not only physical resources but also social position and human capacities. As a result of this, by 2000, CARE had adopted a rights-based approach to development.

One of their buildings was attacked, and people were killed and wounded, during the September 2016 Kabul attacks. In the 2021 Fall of Kabul after American troops withdrawal, and the fear to women and girls, caused by the Taliban takeover of government, CARE's deputy country director, Marianne O'Grady was reported as saying that women would continue educating their families and neighbours, even 'behind the walls', compared to the regime 25 years ago, despite Taliban rules.

Microfinance 
In the early 1990s CARE also developed what would become an important model for cooperative microfinance. This model is called the Village Savings and Loans Associations and it began in 1991 as a pilot project run by CARE's Country Office in Niger. The pilot project was called Mata Masu Dubara and CARE Niger developed the model by adapting the model of Accumulating Savings and Credit Associations. The model involve groups of about 15–30 people who regularly save and borrow using a group fund. Member savings create capital that can be used for short-term loans and capital and interest is shared among the group at the end of a given period (usually about a year), at which point the groups normally re-form to begin a new cycle. Because the bookkeeping required to manage a Village Savings and Loans Association is quite simple and most groups successfully become independent within a year and enjoy a high rate of long-term group survival. CARE has created over 40,000 Village Savings and Loans Associations (over 1 million members total) across Africa, Asia, and Latin America and in 2008 launched Access Africa which aims to extend Village Savings and Loans Association training to 39 African countries by 2018.

The model has also been widely replicated in Africa and Asia and by other large NGOs including Oxfam, Plan International, and Catholic Relief Services.

CARE UK later launched lendwithcare.org, which allows members of the public to make microloans, including green loans, to entrepreneurs in Africa and Asia. It avoids many of the criticisms levelled at Kiva.org.

Acronym redefinition and 50th anniversary 
In 1993 CARE, to reflect its international organizational structure, changed the meaning of its acronym for a third time, adopting its current name the "Cooperative for Assistance and Relief Everywhere". CARE also marked its 50th anniversary in 1994.

CARE expanded the confederation to twelve members in the early 2000s, with CARE Netherlands (formerly the Disaster Relief Agency) joining in 2001 and CARE Thailand (called the Raks Thai Foundation) joining in 2003, becoming the first CARE National Member in a developing country.

CARE's well-known "I am Powerful" campaign launched in the US in September 2006 and was intended to bring public attention to the organization's long-standing focus on women's empowerment. CARE states that its programs focus on women and girls both because the world's poor are disproportionately female and because women's empowerment is thought to be an important driver of development. CARE also emphasizes that it considers working with boys and men an important part of women's empowerment, and that women's empowerment benefits both genders.

In 2007 CARE announced that by 2009 it would no longer accept certain types of US food aid worth some $45 million a year, arguing that these types of food aid are inefficient and harmful to local markets. Specifically, CARE announced that it would forego all monetized food aid (surplus US food shipped to charities in the developing world who then sell the food on the local market to finance development projects) and all food aid intended to establish a commercial advantage for the donor, and would increase its commitment to buying food aid locally. CARE also announced that it would no longer accept USDA food through Title 1 (concessional sales) or Section 416 (surplus disposal) because these programs are intended mainly to establish a commercial advantage for US agriculture.

In 2011 CARE added its first affiliate member, CARE India, and in 2012 the CI board accepted CARE Peru as CARE's second affiliate member. CARE India became a full member in November 2013. The CI board accepted CARE Peru as a full member of the confederation in June 2015.

CARE is currently one of the only major NGOs to make their database of project evaluations publicly available, and to regularly conduct a meta-analysis of evaluation methodologies and overall organizational impact.

Structure 
CARE International is a confederation of fourteen CARE National Members, coordinated by the CARE International Secretariat. The Secretariat is based in Geneva, Switzerland, with offices in New York City and in Brussels to liaise with the United Nations and European institutions, respectively.

Each CARE National Member is an autonomous non-governmental organization registered in the country and runs programs, fundraising, and communications activities both in its own country and in developing countries in which CARE operates. The fourteen CARE National Members and four affiliate members are:

Affiliate members are marked with an asterisk (*)

Programming scope 
In 2016 CARE was active in the following countries (as well as in member and affiliate countries):

A total of 962 development and humanitarian aid projects were carried out in these countries, with 80,120,323 million people directly reached. The breakdown by region was as follows:

For the fiscal year 2016, CARE reported a budget of more than 574 million Euros and a staff of 9,175 (94% of them local citizens of the country where they work).

Emergency response 
CARE supports emergency relief as well as prevention, preparedness, and recovery programs. In 2016, CARE reportedly reached more than 7.2 million people through its humanitarian response. CARE's core sectors for emergency response are Food Security, Shelter, WASH and Sexual & Reproductive Health. CARE is a signatory of major international humanitarian standards and codes of conduct including the Code of Conduct for the International Red Cross and Red Crescent Movement and NGOs in Disaster Relief, the Sphere standards, and the Humanitarian Accountability Partnership (HAP) principles and standards.

Networks and partnerships 
CARE is a signatory to the following standards of humanitarian intervention: the Code of Conduct for The International Red Cross and Red Crescent Movement and NGOs in Disaster Relief, the Sphere standards, and the Core Humanitarian Standard
As well, CARE is a member of a number of networks aiming to improve the quality and coordination of humanitarian aid: The Emergency Capacity Building Project, The Consortium of British Humanitarian Agencies, the Active Learning Network for Accountability and Performance in Humanitarian Action, the Steering Committee for Humanitarian Response, the International Council for Voluntary Agencies, and the INGO Accountability Charter. CARE also regularly engages in joint advocacy campaigns with other major NGOs. The Global Campaign for Climate Change Action is one example.

List of Secretaries General

References

External links 

 

International charities
Development charities
Humanitarian aid organizations of World War II
Hunger relief organizations
Water-related charities
1945 establishments in the United States